Liverpool is a 2008 Argentine drama film directed by Lisandro Alonso, co-written with Salvador Roselli, and starring Juan Fernández. It screened at many international film festivals, including Cannes Film Festival, Toronto International Film Festival and Maryland Film Festival. The film was released on DVD by Kino International on 30 November 2010. The cinematography was by Lucio Bonelli.

The film follows Farrel, a merchant seaman who applies for leave in Ushuaia, Tierra del Fuego to visit his mother in his home village after twenty years away. Farrel is played by Juan Fernández, a native of Ushuaia who drives a snow plow for a living.

The LA Times called it a "bold, successful attempt at a film narrative in which images are everything and words are few." The New York Times concluded that "Although it has its visual pleasures, and there’s plenty to admire about his compositions, the journey in “Liverpool” seems comparatively slight". Variety felt that the "[b]rilliance of the overall conception and execution will immediately hit some viewers, while others may need to mull things over."

References

External links
 

2008 films
Ushuaia
Argentine drama films
Films directed by Lisandro Alonso
2000s Spanish-language films
2000s Argentine films